Narsingh Deo (January 2, 1936—January 13, 2023) was a professor and the Charles N. Millican Endowed Chair of the Department of Computer Science, University of Central Florida. He received his Ph.D. for his dissertation 'Topological Analysis of Active Networks and Generalization of Hamiltonian tree' from Northwestern University, IL., in 1965; S. L. Hakimi was his adviser. Deo was professor at the Indian Institute of Technology, Kanpur.

Books
 Graph Theory with Application to Engineering and Computer Science, Prentice-Hall, Englewood Cliffs, N.J., 1974, 480 pages.
 Combinatorial Algorithms: Theory and Practice (with E.M. Reingold and J. Nievergelt), Prentice-Hall, Englewood Cliffs, NJ., 1977, 433 pages.
 System Simulation with Digital Computers, Prentice-Hall, Englewood Cliffs, N.J., 1979, 200 pages.
 Discrete Optimization Algorithms: With Pascal Programs (with M.M. Syslo and J. S. Kowalik), Prentice-Hall, Englewood Cliffs, N.J., 1983, 542 pages.

References
 
 N. Deo's profile
  CS Faculty

Graph theorists
Northwestern University alumni
University of Central Florida faculty
Year of birth missing (living people)
American computer scientists
Living people
Academic staff of IIT Kanpur